Walter Mazzarri (born 1 October 1961) is an Italian former footballer and head coach, most recently in charge of Serie A club Cagliari.

After a 14-year playing career with Italian clubs including Reggiana and Empoli, Mazzarri coached several smaller Italian sides and in 2007 took up a managerial position with Sampdoria. With the help of the attacking partnership of Antonio Cassano and Giampaolo Pazzini, he led the team to qualify for the UEFA Cup in his first season, and subsequently reached the Coppa Italia final the next year. In 2009, he joined Napoli, where he implemented a 3–4–3 formation with which he later became associated. With the attacking trio of Ezequiel Lavezzi, Edinson Cavani and Marek Hamšík, nicknamed I tre tenori ("The three tenors"), he helped the team qualify for the UEFA Champions League for the first time in the club's history in 2011, and won the Coppa Italia the following season, the club's first trophy in over 20 years. In his final season with the team, he managed a second-place finish in Serie A, the club's best league finish in over 20 years. In 2013, he moved to Internazionale, but was sacked halfway through his second season with the club. He later managed Torino in Serie A, and had one year in charge of Watford in England's Premier League in 2016–17.

As a manager in Italy, Mazzarri became known for the excuses for poor performances that he made during post-match interviews.

Playing career
Mazzarri, a midfielder and a product of Fiorentina's youth system, made his professional debut in 1981 for Pescara of Serie B, and played a short Serie A stint in Cagliari the following season, before being sold to Reggiana. He had his longest period at Empoli, who won promotion to Serie A for the first time during his time with the Tuscan side. After several spells with mostly minor teams, including a two-year stint with Acireale where he was part of the team who won a historic first promotion to Serie B, and then playing in the Italian second tier in 1993–94, Mazzarri ended his playing career in 1995 with Sassari Torres.

Managerial career

Early years
Mazzarri started his coaching career as Renzo Ulivieri's assistant at Napoli in 1998. His first spell in charge came in 2001–02 for Sicilian Serie C2 team Acireale, where he had been a player from 1992 to 1994. Subsequently, he returned to his native Tuscany to coach Pistoiese of Serie C1 in 2002–03 and Livorno of Serie B in 2003–04, bringing the amaranto led by Cristiano Lucarelli back to Serie A. He was coach of Reggina from 2004 to 2007, leading the Calabrian side to Serie A survival in three consecutive seasons, the last obtained on the final day of the season despite an 11-point deduction. In May 2007, Mazzarri was made an honorary citizen of Reggio Calabria, after helping the club avoid relegation during the 2006–07 Serie A season.

Sampdoria
On 31 May 2007 he was announced as new Sampdoria coach. He served as Sampdoria boss for two seasons, overseeing a considerable improvement in results, thanks to the likes of the attacking duo of Antonio Cassano, who publicly praised Mazzarri's coaching abilities, and Giampaolo Pazzini. Sampdoria's 2007–08 campaign ended in an impressive sixth place, which ensured qualification for the UEFA Cup. Mazzarri's fortunes declined slightly in 2008–09, as the blucerchiati ended their campaign in 13th place; despite this, he managed to guide his team into the Coppa Italia Final, notably defeating champions Inter 3–1 on aggregate in the semi-finals, before losing on penalties to Lazio in the final. Mazzarri left Sampdoria by mutual consent at the end of the 2008–09 season.

Napoli
On 6 October 2009 he was appointed manager of Napoli, replacing Roberto Donadoni. He finished his debut season in sixth place in Serie A, and was handed a new three-year contract at the end of the campaign.

In 2010–11, Mazzarri's Napoli finished third in the league and qualified directly for the group phase of the 2011–12 UEFA Champions League – their first time in Europe's premier competition in 21 years. His team were known for an attacking 3–4–3 formation with a frontline of Ezequiel Lavezzi, Marek Hamšík and Edinson Cavani. They finished second in their Champions League group, behind Bayern Munich but ahead of Manchester City and Villareal, to meet Chelsea in the last 16. Napoli won 3–1 at home in the first leg; they were subsequently beaten 4–1 at Stamford Bridge after extra time, being eliminated by the eventual champions.

Napoli won the 2012 Coppa Italia Final over undefeated league champions Juventus on 20 May; this was Juventus's only loss of the season, and Napoli's first title in over 20 years. On 11 August that year, the club suffered a controversial 4–2 extra-time defeat to Juventus in the 2012 Supercoppa Italiana, which saw two Napoli players sent off as well as Mazzarri. He left the Azzurri on 19 May 2013, after leading them to a 2nd-place finish and a spot in the Champions League at the end of the 2012–13 Serie A season; this was the club's best league finish in over 20 years.

Inter
Mazzarri was officially appointed as the Inter manager on 24 May 2013, after Andrea Stramaccioni was dismissed for a poor performance in the 2012–13 season. On 2 July 2014, he signed a one-year extension to tie him to the team until 30 June 2016.

He was sacked by Inter after a series of disappointing results on 14 November 2014, leaving the club in ninth place. He parted with the club before the 12th matchday, while they were five points below their season objective of the third position.

Watford

On 21 May 2016, Watford confirmed they had reached an agreement with Mazzarri to become Head Coach from 1 July 2016 on a three-year contract. He joined a club owned by his compatriot Giampaolo Pozzo, and worked without being able to speak English.

Mazzarri secured Watford's Premier League status that season, finishing one place above relegation in 17th, a four-place dip on their previous campaign. It was announced on 17 May 2017 that his contract would be terminated at the end of his first season at the club.

Torino
On 4 January 2018, Mazzarri was appointed manager of Torino, replacing Siniša Mihajlović. With a 7th-place finish in 2018–19 he led the Granata to the UEFA Europa League, where they were eliminated in the play-off round by Wolverhampton Wanderers.

On 4 February 2020, Mazzarri was dismissed following back-to-back 7–0 and 4–0 defeats to Atalanta and Lecce, respectively.

Cagliari
On 15 September 2021, Mazzarri signed a three-year contract with Serie A club Cagliari as their new head coach, replacing Leonardo Semplici. During his tenure, Cagliari failed to improve performances and found themselves deep in relegation trouble with three games to go, leading to Mazzarri's dismissal from his position on 2 May 2022.

Managerial statistics

Honours

Manager
Sampdoria
Coppa Italia Runner-up: 2008–09

Napoli
Coppa Italia: 2011–12
Supercoppa Italiana Runner-up: 2012
Serie A Runner-up: 2012–13

 Individual
Enzo Bearzot Award: 2012

References

External links

1961 births
Living people
Sportspeople from the Province of Livorno
Association football midfielders
Italian footballers
Serie A players
A.C. Reggiana 1919 players
Modena F.C. players
Delfino Pescara 1936 players
Cagliari Calcio players
ACF Fiorentina players
Empoli F.C. players
Italian football managers
Serie A managers
U.S. Pistoiese 1921 managers
Reggina 1914 managers
U.S. Livorno 1915 managers
U.C. Sampdoria managers
S.S.C. Napoli managers
Torino F.C. managers
Inter Milan managers
Watford F.C. managers
Cagliari Calcio managers
Premier League managers
Italian expatriate football managers
Expatriate football managers in England
S.E.F. Torres 1903 players
Footballers from Tuscany